Peter Todd (born 1962) is a Canadian professor and academic administrator. He was the dean of McGill University's Desautels Faculty of Management from 2005 to 2014. From July 2015 to October 2020, he has served as the director of HEC Paris.

Early life
Peter Todd was born in 1962 in Canada. He graduated from McGill University, where he earned a bachelor's degree in commerce, finance and information systems. He subsequently earned a PhD in business administration from the Sauder School of Business at the University of British Columbia.

Career
Todd was a professor of business administration at Queen's University from 1989 to 1997. He was a professor and associate dean at the University of Houston's Bauer College of Business from 1997 to 2001, and associate dean of graduate programs at the University of Virginia's McIntire School of Commerce from 2002 to 2005. He returned to his alma mater, McGill University, in 2005, where he served as the dean of its Desautels Faculty of Management until 2014. During his tenure, he led a $75 million fundraising campaign.

Todd succeeded Bernard Ramanantsoa as the dean of HEC Paris in July 2015. Under his leadership, he has expanded the partnership with the University of Paris-Saclay.

Personal life
Todd is married, and he has no children.

References

1962 births
Living people
Canadian academic administrators
Canadian expatriates in France
McGill University Faculty of Management alumni
UBC Sauder School of Business alumni
Academic staff of the Queen's University at Kingston
University of Houston faculty
University of Virginia faculty
Business school deans
Academic staff of HEC Paris